Varna Peninsula is a roughly rectangular predominantly ice-covered peninsula forming the northeast extremity of Livingston Island in the South Shetland Islands, Antarctica.  It is bounded by Hero Bay to the northwest, by Moon Bay to the southeast, and by McFarlane Strait to the northeast.

The peninsula is approximately 14 km long in the southwest–northeast direction and 10 km wide, with a central area occupied by Vidin Heights. The north and east extremities of Varna Peninsula are formed by Phelps Promontory and Williams Point, and by Inott Point respectively.  The coast is indented by Lister Cove and Dragon Cove to the northeast, and by Griffin Cove, Charybdis Cove and Eliseyna Cove to the northwest. Bezmer Point is also on the northwest coast of the peninsula.

The area was visited by early 19th century sealers.  Williams Point was the first land discovered in the Antarctic Treaty area, by the British navigator William Smith on 19 February 1819.

Varna is the name of a major city on the Bulgarian Black Sea Coast. This is one of the Bulgarian names bestowed on previously nameless geographical features by the Tangra 2004/05 Expedition.

Location

See also
 Vidin Heights
 Livingston Island

Maps
 South Shetland Islands. Scale 1:200000 topographic map. DOS 610 Sheet W 62 60. Tolworth, UK, 1968.
 Islas Livingston y Decepción.  Mapa topográfico a escala 1:100000.  Madrid: Servicio Geográfico del Ejército, 1991.
 L.L. Ivanov. Livingston Island: Central-Eastern Region. Scale 1:25000 topographic map.  Sofia: Antarctic Place-names Commission of Bulgaria, 1996.
 S. Soccol, D. Gildea and J. Bath. Livingston Island, Antarctica. Scale 1:100000 satellite map. The Omega Foundation, USA, 2004.
 L.L. Ivanov et al., Antarctica: Livingston Island and Greenwich Island, South Shetland Islands (from English Strait to Morton Strait, with illustrations and ice-cover distribution), 1:100000 scale topographic map, Antarctic Place-names Commission of Bulgaria, Sofia, 2005
 L.L. Ivanov. Antarctica: Livingston Island and Greenwich, Robert, Snow and Smith Islands. Scale 1:120000 topographic map. Troyan: Manfred Wörner Foundation, 2010.  (First edition 2009. )
 Antarctic Digital Database (ADD). Scale 1:250000 topographic map of Antarctica. Scientific Committee on Antarctic Research (SCAR). Since 1993, regularly upgraded and updated.
 L.L. Ivanov. Antarctica: Livingston Island and Smith Island. Scale 1:100000 topographic map. Manfred Wörner Foundation, 2017.

References
 Varna Peninsula. SCAR Composite Antarctic Gazetteer.
 Ivanov, L. General Geography and History of Livingston Island. In: Bulgarian Antarctic Research: A Synthesis. Eds. C. Pimpirev and N. Chipev. Sofia: St. Kliment Ohridski University Press, 2015. pp. 17–28. 
 Bulgarian Antarctic Gazetteer. Antarctic Place-names Commission. (details in Bulgarian, basic data in English)

External links
 Varna Peninsula. Copernix satellite image

Peninsulas of Livingston Island
Bulgaria and the Antarctic
Varna, Bulgaria